Transcendental Étude No. 7 in E Major, "Eroica" is the seventh of the twelve Transcendental Études by Franz Liszt. It is a study of rapid downward runs, bravura and octaves (at the end).

In a customary manner of Liszt, the piece begins with some sharp notes and fast, powerful descending scales. The "heroic" theme is then introduced. The piece becomes more chaotic and finally erupts in difficult octave arpeggiations. It ends with a final restatement of the theme.

The theme of this piece is similar to that of the Pink Panther, both of which include some chromaticism in their respective melodies. While both themes are similar, it is unlikely that Henry Mancini took inspiration from this piece, as chromaticism in melody and harmony are a commonplace in music. 

The material is not considered very difficult in comparison to the other études, however the piece is considered a challenge to execute well compared to other piano repertoire. Many composers and pianists, including Leslie Howard and Ferruccio Busoni, consider the 1837 version of this piece superior to the final Transcendental version.

External links 
 

Transcendental 07
1852 compositions
Compositions in E-flat major